Giannantonio Sperotto (born November 7, 1950 in Breganze) is a retired Italian professional football player.

He played for 5 seasons (66 games, 8 goals) in the Serie A for Vicenza Calcio, A.S. Varese 1910, S.S.C. Napoli, F.C. Catanzaro and A.S. Roma.

See also
Football in Italy
List of football clubs in Italy

References

1950 births
Living people
Italian footballers
Serie A players
L.R. Vicenza players
Udinese Calcio players
S.S.D. Lucchese 1905 players
U.S. Avellino 1912 players
S.S.D. Varese Calcio players
S.S.C. Napoli players
U.S. Catanzaro 1929 players
A.S. Roma players
A.C. Reggiana 1919 players
Association football forwards